The Schürzenjäger, formerly Zillertaler Schürzenjäger, are one of the most successful bands of Austria.  (Literally translated, a Schürzenjäger is a "apron hunter": Schürze = apron, Jäger = hunter, i.e. The Skirt-Chasers) The band was founded in 1973; according to the band history, they were named "Schürzenjäger" by a female bartender in Austria during a concert, when they didn't have a band name.

While they started out playing traditional music with modern instruments, their style developed over the years to incorporate  folk music, Pop music, and Rock music. One of their first big hits was the "Zillertaler Hochzeitsmarsch",  a modern interpretation of a traditional folk dance melody. From then on they began to introduce more rock elements, inspired by their new (1990) drummer Patrick Cox. After Zillertal Hochzeitsblues (1990) they moved to the wider German audience under Montana (Later BMG Ariola) in 1991. 

With their commercial success, "Schürzenjäger" became the epitome for filling the gap between rock and "Volksmusik" in Austria, establishing the genre of "Alpen Rock" (Alpine Rock). The folk music community, however, saw the success of the Zillertaler Hochzeitsmarsch not as a success but as an abuse of traditional music.

Schürzenjäger regularly ended their tours with the biggest open-air concerts in Austria. Since 1988 these concerts, called "Alpen Air" (a pun of "Alpen" and "Open Air"), were played every other year. From March to July 2007, the Schürzenjäger went on tour for the last album "Lust auf mehr". This was the final tour with the lineup around band leader Steinlechner, culminating in the traditional "Alpen Air" in Finkenberg, Zillertal on Saturday 21 July 2007. The Eberharters then founded their own band, the "Hey Mann! Band" (HM!B), which performed Schürzenjäger songs live, an album was also recorded.

On 3 May 2011 the comeback and a new album of the Schürzenjäger was announced for September 2011, before that an open-air concert will stage on 6 August in Finkenberg. The band consists of the Hey Mann! Band members Stevy (Stefan Wilhelm, vocals), Johannes Hintersteiner, Andreas Marberger, Georg Daviotis and the Eberharters, the last being the only members of the old Schürzenjäger lineup. According to the band, former band leader Steinlechner doesn't want to get back on stage, save for a few guest appearances now and then. Cox and von Haniel are already busy with other projects.

Discography

Studio albums as "Zillertaler Schürzenjäger"
 Die Zillertaler Schürzenjäger (1977)
 Aber heut geht's auf (But today we're off, 1978)
 Grüne Tannen (Green fir trees, 1979)
 Ich habe Dir zu danken (I have to thank you, 1983)
 Ohne Jodeln geht die Zenzi nicht gern schlafen (Without yodelling Zenzi doesn't like to go to sleep, 1983)
 10 Jahre Zillertaler Schürzenjäger (10 years of Zillertaler Schürzenjäger, 1984)
 Fata Morgana (released under the band name "WAP die Schürzenjäger", 1984)
 Sierra Madre (1987)
 Zillertaler Hochzeitsblues (Zillertal Wedding Blues, 1990)
 Zillertaler Schürzenjäger '92 (1991)
 Teure Heimat (Dear homeland, 1992)
 Typisch Schürzenjäger (Typical Schürzenjäger, 1993)
 A Weihnacht wie's früher war (Christmas as it used to be, 1993)
 Glory-Hallelujah!! (1995)

Studio albums as "Schürzenjäger" 
 Träume sind stärker (Dreams are stronger, 1996)
 Homo erectus (1997)
 25 Jahre Schürzenjäger (25 years of Schürzenjäger, 1998)
 Es hört nie auf (It never ends, 1999)
 Treff' ma uns in der Mitt'n (Let's meet in the middle, 2001)
 Tu's jetzt! (Do it now!, 2002)
 Hinter dem Horizont (Beyond the horizon, 2004)
 Weihnachten miteinander (Christmas together, 2005)
 Lust auf mehr (Desire for more, 2006)
 Schürzenjäger 2007 - Das Beste zum Abschied (Schürzenjäger 2007 - The Best Of for the farewell, 2007)
 Das Beste vom Besten (The Best of the Best, 2016)
 Herzblut (Heartblood, 2017)

Live albums 
 Live Folge 1 - Finkenberg Mitschnitt (Live Volume 1 - Finkenberg Recording, 1990)
 Live Folge 2 - Finkenberg Mitschnitt (Live Volume 2 - Finkenberg Recording, 1990)
 20 Jahre Zillertaler Schürzenjäger - Rebellion in den Alpen (20 years of Zillertaler Schürzenjäger - Rebellion in the Alps, 1994) - (Live concert from Vienna during 1993 tour)
 30 wilde Jahre (30 wild years, 2003)
 Es Ist Wieder Schürzenjägerzeit (2013)

Other 
 Karaoke (1996)

VHS video 
 Live - Finkenberg Mitschnitt (1990)
 Schürzenjägerzeit (Schürzenjäger Time, 1992) (accompanies Schürzenjäger '92)
 20 Jahre Zillertaler Schürzenjäger - Rebellion in den Alpen (20 years of Zillertaler Schürzenjäger - Rebellion in the Alps, 1994)
 Träume sind stärker  (Dreams are stronger, 1996)
 25 Jahre Schürzenjäger - Open Air Walchsee '97 (25 years of Schürzenjäger - Open Air Walchsee '97, 1998)
 Draußen in der Heimat  (Outdoors at Home, 2001) (accompanies Treff' ma uns in der Mitt'n)
 Tu's jetzt! (Do it now!, 2002) (accompanies Tu's Jetzt!)

DVD video 
 Tu's jetzt! (Do it now!, 2002) (accompanies album Tu's jetzt!)
 30 wilde Jahre (30 wild years) - (Live concert from Finkenberg during 2003 Tour)
 Hinter dem Horizont - LIVE (Live concert from Cologne during the 2005 Tour)
 Schürzenjäger 2007 - Das Beste zum Abschied (Schürzenjäger 2007 - The Best Of for the farewell - Finkenberg Open Air 2007)

Awards 
 1978: Goldene Musikanten
 1992: Edelweiß from Frau im Spiegel (Category: Group)
 1994: Goldenes Ticket
 1996: Goldene Europa
 1998: Schlagerdiamant
 1998: UNHCR Goodwill Ambassador
 1999: Goldene Stimmgabel
 2002: Amadeus Austrian Music Award (nominated)
 2007: Golden roll of honour of Finkenberg

External links 
 

Austrian pop music groups
Yodelers
United Nations High Commissioner for Refugees Goodwill Ambassadors
Polka musicians
Austrian folk music groups